Daniel "Danny" Secundus Fichelscher, (born 3 July 1953 in Berlin), is a German multi-instrumentalist who played a pivotal role in Krautrock band Popol Vuh, was a member of the German group Gila and is currently Amon Düül II's drummer. Fichelscher is the son of jazz pianist and singer Toby Fichelscher.

Career
Daniel Fichelscher was, for most of their history, Florian Fricke's only stable partner in Popol Vuh. He wasn't a founding member, having joined in 1973 (three years after the group's foundation) for the recording of the album Seligpreisung and replaced guitarist Conny Veit the following year in 1974. While playing with Popol Vuh, he also occasionally played drums and congas with the Krautrock band Amon Düül II, appearing for example on the albums Carnival in Babylon (1972), Wolf City (1972; on which he also sang and played guitar), and Vortex (1981). Together with Fricke, he also played in Conny Veit's group Gila on their second album, Bury My Heart at Wounded Knee.

Fichelscher's importance within Popol Vuh began to diminish around 1991 when he was flanked by Guido Hieronymus, who also played guitar and who greatly influenced the group's music.  But Fichelscher still maintained a significant role in the group.  Since 2006, after Florian Fricke's death and Popol Vuh's dissolution, Fichelscher has played drums again with Amon Düül II, replacing the group's original drummer, the late Peter Leopold.

Discography with Popol Vuh
Seligpreisung (1973)
Einsjäger und Siebenjäger (1974)
Das Hohelied Salomos (1975)
Aguirre (1975)
Letzte Tage - Letzte Nächte (1976)
Herz aus Glas (1977)
Nosferatu (1978)
Brüder des Schattens - Söhne des Lichts (1978)
Die Nacht der Seele (1979)
Sei still, wisse ICH BIN (1981)
Agape - Agape (1983)
Spirit of Peace (1985)
Cobra Verde (1987)
For You and Me (1991)

Discography with Amon Düül II 
Carnival in Babylon (1972)
Wolf City (1972)
Live in London (live) (1973)

Discography with Utopia 
Utopia (reissued as by Amon Düül II) (1973)

Notes

External links
Photo of Daniel Fichelscher in 2006 with Amon Düül II

References 
 CD sleeve notes
  Italian fan site, in Italian and English
  Dutch fan site in English

Living people
German male musicians
German electronic musicians
Krautrock
1953 births